External history of a language refers to the social and geopolitical history of the language:  migrations, conquests, language contact, and uses of the language in trade, education, literature, law, liturgy, mass media, etc.  It is contrasted with internal history, which refers to linguistic forms (phonology, morphology, syntax, and lexicon) and semantics.

References
 Matthews, Peter H. (1997).  The Concise Oxford Dictionary of Linguistics.  Oxford/New York:  Oxford University Press.  .
 Trask, R[obert] L[awrence] (2000). The Dictionary of Historical and Comparative Linguistics.  Chicago/London: Fitzroy Dearborn. .

Historical linguistics
Sociolinguistics